Paulsen is a Danish, Norwegian and German patronymic
surname, from the given name Paul prefix, of Latin origin, itself derived from Paulus, meaning "small". People with the name Paulsen include:

 Albert Paulsen (1925–2004), Ecuadorian-American actor
August Paulsen (1871–1927), Danish American businessman
Axel Paulsen (1855–1938), Norwegian figure skater
Dave Paulsen, American basketball coach
David Paulsen, American television screenwriter and producer
Diego Paulsen (born 1987), Chilean politician
Edvin Paulsen (1889–1963), Norwegian gymnast
Erik Paulsen (born 1965), former US Representative from Minnesota
Frederik Paulsen Sr (1909–1997), Medical Doctor and the founder of Ferring Pharmaceuticals
Frederik Paulsen Jr (born 1950), businessman, son of the founder of Ferring Pharmaceuticals
Fridtjof Paulsen (1895–1988), Norwegian speed skater
Friedrich Paulsen (1846–1908), German philosopher
Gary Paulsen (1939–2021), American writer
Harald Paulsen (1895–1954), German actor
Harold Paulsen, American collegiate ice hockey player
Jan Paulsen (born 1935), President of the General Conference of Seventh-day Adventists
John C. Paulsen, American architect
Julius Paulsen (1860–1940), Danish painter
Kai Paulsen (1947–2002), Norwegian journalist
Keith Paulsen, American engineer
Kraig Paulsen, American State Representative in Iowa
Leif Otto Paulsen, Norwegian football midfielder
Lisa Paulsen, American CEO, President of the Entertainment Industry Foundation
Liv Paulsen (1925–2001), Norwegian  sprinter and shot putter
Louis Paulsen (1833–1891), German chess player
Marianne Paulsen, Norwegian football defender
Marit Paulsen (born 1939), Swedish politician
Nancy Paulsen, publisher of Nancy Paulsen Books at Penguin Group
Otto A. Paulsen (1875–1957), American farmer and politician
Pat Paulsen (1927–1997), American comedian
Rob Paulsen (born 1956), American voice actor

See also
Paulson
Paulsson
Poulsen

Norwegian-language surnames
Danish-language surnames
Patronymic surnames
Surnames from given names